A modesty panel is something added to various items such as clothes or furniture for the purpose of concealment.  In particular it refers to a thin board of wood or metal that is attached to the front of a desk, drafting table, electronic organ, or similar item, to shield legs, ankles, or feet from view. This is also known as a modesty board.

Furniture

The panel provides privacy for the person seated at the desk or organ, as it covers the upper part of the legs. This privacy role is  particularly useful in cases where the desk or organ is positioned in front of a class or hall. The modesty panel may also provide structural support for the four legs of the desk or organ, it may also be used as a place for affixing electric cabling, computer cabling, or electrical extension boxes.

Early modesty panels were often used in Quaker meeting houses and other churches of the eighteenth and nineteenth centuries, growing in popularity during the Victorian era. Modesty panels might be found running up the sides of stairways to discourage passers-by from looking up dresses. They were also added to the sides of church organs, shielding the musician's feet and legs from the congregation's view as she played the organ's pedals. Later, as women entered the secretarial force in large numbers during the twentieth century, modesty panels were  added to office desks.

Clothing
Modesty panels may cover the cleavage of a bust or the crotch, in particular providing a moisture-proof barrier under a skirt.  It has also been used for a skirt fitted as part of a woman's swimsuit.

References

Desks
Electronic organs
Furniture